The Skeleton World Cup season is a yearly competition first organized by the International Bobsleigh and Skeleton Federation since 1986–87. The women's version of this event debuted in 1996–97.

Men
Debuted: 1986–87

Medals:

Women 
Debuted: 1996–97

Medals:

All-time medal count

References
 
 

 
Skeleton competitions
Recurring sporting events established in 1986
World cups in winter sports